Jean-Luc Servino (born November 21, 1989) is an Italian director, writer, screenwriter and cinematographer, best known in the independent circuits for his shorts, winning several awards, including the Culver City Film Festival, the Eurasia International Film Festival for Best Director and Los Angeles Film Awards for Best Cinematographer.

Born and raised in Naples, Servino developed an interest in filmmaking from a young age. He start shoot shorts in 2014 winning the Web Award at OnAir Festival Sorrento in his first participation in a film festival.

He focusing his attention on social issues winning a Humanitarian Award in 2016. In the same year he publish his first book, La Visione di Ben. In 2017 he won a Regional Award for Best Musical for an innovative production who merging cinema and live theater.

He start the road for International Film Festivals with Zackary (2017) (dedicated to the father Ferdinando Servino), Whiskey For Robinson (2018) and Dear Gaia (2019), receiving several accolades.

He is considered the dreamers filmmaker to given the opportunity in 2018 to about 50 indie artists to show up their potential in a web-series called "Edge - For the dreamers".

In 2020 he was awarded "Eccellenza della Città Metropolitana di Napoli" for his artistic achievements.

He studied filmmaking at London Film Academy and American Film Institute. His own style is like a mix of french Nouvelle Vague, Italian neorealism and russian existentialism, a very unique kind of cinema vision, style and technique.

Filmography 
 Zackary (2017)
 Whiskey For Robinson (2018)
 Dear Gaia (2019)
 Lettera dal professor V (2021)

Books 
 La visione di Ben (2016)

References

External links 
 Jean-Luc Servino on IMDb
 Jean-Luc Servino on CinemaItaliano
 Official Site

1989 births
Italian film directors
Living people